The Italy national U-17 football team is the national under-17 football team of Italy and is controlled by the Italian Football Federation.

The team competes in the UEFA European Under-17 Championship, held every year. The team, if qualified, also competes in the FIFA U-17 World Cup, which is held every two years.

Competitive record

FIFA Under-17 World Cup

*Draws include knockout matches decided on penalty kicks.

UEFA European Under-17 Championship

*Draws include knockout matches decided on penalty kicks.

Results and fixtures

2022

Honours
 FIFA Under-17 World Cup
 Fourth Place: 1987

 UEFA European Under-17 Championship (formerly UEFA European Under-16 Championship)
 
 Winner: 1982
 Runners-up: 1986; 1993; 1998; 2013; 2018; 2019
 Third Place: 1992; 2005

Current squad
The following 20 players were called up for the Elite round of the 2023 UEFA European Under-17 Championship.

See also
 FIFA U-17 World Cup
 UEFA European Under-17 Championship

Notes

References

European national under-17 association football teams
Under-17
Youth football in Italy